Staveley Central was a railway station serving the town of Staveley, Derbyshire, England.

History
The station was on the Great Central Main Line which ran between London Marylebone and Manchester via Sheffield Victoria. It was opened on 1 June 1892 as Staveley Town and was renamed Staveley Central on 25 September 1950 by British Railways to reduce confusion with the ex-MR station, also called Staveley Town, which was about 250 yards away on the same street. The latter station was on the Barrow Hill to Clowne and Barrow Hill to Pleasley West lines. The renaming also reduced the likelihood of people confusing the station with that at Barrow Hill and Staveley Works, which was officially renamed Barrow Hill on 18 June 1951 to further differentiate the stations. 

Staveley Central closed on 4 March 1963, but continued to serve summer weekend excursion traffic until the end of the 1964 season.

The timber-built booking hall was on the Lowgates road overbridge and there was a waiting room on each platform. The station was also the junction for branches to the Ireland, Hartington and Markham Collieries and at the south end was Staveley (G.C.) Engine Shed (shed code 38D and latterly 41H in BR days). This, too, was subject to confusion with the ex-MR "Staveley" engine shed over a mile away at Barrow Hill, which was coded 18D in BR days. Staveley ex-GC engine shed has been demolished but the ex-MR Barrow Hill Engine Shed survives as a railway engineering and preservation site.

The location of Staveley Central station has been turned into a road to linking to the M1 motorway junction 29A.

See also
Four stations have had "Staveley" in their name at some point in their history:
 Staveley Central, the subject of this article, which was known as "Staveley Town" from 1892 to 1950.
 , a Midland Railway station on another line about 250 yards away on the same street,
 Barrow Hill which in its early years was named "Staveley".

References

Notes

Sources

External links

 

Disused railway stations in Derbyshire
Former Great Central Railway stations
Railway stations in Great Britain opened in 1892
Railway stations in Great Britain closed in 1963